Alejandro Martín Kenig  (born 31 January 1969 in Mar del Plata) best known as "el gordo" (The fat) is a retired Argentine footballer who played for a number of clubs both in Argentina and South America, including Club Atlético Platense, Talleres de Córdoba, Club Bolívar and Club Sport Emelec.

External links
 Argentine Primera statistics at FutbolXXI.com

References

1969 births
Living people
Sportspeople from Mar del Plata
Argentine footballers
Talleres de Córdoba footballers
Club Atlético Platense footballers
Atlético Tucumán footballers
C.S. Emelec footballers
S.D. Quito footballers
L.D.U. Quito footballers
Deportivo Español footballers
Maccabi Tel Aviv F.C. players
Hakoah Maccabi Amidar Ramat Gan F.C. players
Expatriate footballers in Israel
Deportivo Cali footballers
C.D. Olimpia players
Expatriate footballers in Colombia
C.D. Cuenca footballers
Argentine expatriate sportspeople in Bolivia
Expatriate footballers in Ecuador
Club Deportivo Universidad Católica footballers
Argentine expatriate sportspeople in Israel
Expatriate footballers in Chile
Club Bolívar players
Coquimbo Unido footballers
Expatriate footballers in Bolivia
Expatriate footballers in Honduras
Argentine Primera División players
Categoría Primera A players
Chilean Primera División players
Bolivian Primera División players
Liga Nacional de Fútbol Profesional de Honduras players
Ecuadorian Serie A players
Argentine expatriate sportspeople in Colombia
Argentine expatriate sportspeople in Ecuador
Argentine expatriate sportspeople in Chile
Association football forwards